The Nedonas (katharevousa: Νέδων Nedon) is a river Messenia, Peloponnese, Greece.

Geography
The river rises on the western slope of the Taygetus mountains, at around 1,100 m elevation, near the village Artemisia. It flows in southwestern direction, through a steep and narrow gorge. It is fed by several small tributaries, including the Nedousa. It flows through the city centre of Kalamata, where it empties into the Messenian Gulf. The Greek National Road 82 (Pylos - Kalamata - Sparta) runs along the river for a part of its length.

See also
List of rivers in Greece

References

Landforms of Messenia
Rivers of Greece
Rivers of Peloponnese (region)
Drainage basins of the Ionian Sea